Ruffin may refer to:

People
Ruffin (name), list of people with the name

Places
Riffa, Bahrain, formerly known in English as Ruffin
Ruffin, North Carolina
Ruffin, South Carolina

See also
 Tierra Ruffin-Pratt (born 1991), American basketball player
 Ruffins
 Rufin